Pierre Raoul Gendron,  (May 1, 1916 – February 16, 1984) was a Canadian academic who was the first dean of the Faculty of Pure and Applied Sciences at the University of Ottawa from 1953 until 1962.

As president of the board of directors of Dow Breweries, Gendron convinced the brewer to fund a planetarium in Montreal, overseeing the creation of the Dow Planetarium.

In 1970, he was made a Companion of the Order of Canada "for his scientific and administrative contribution to industry and his service to his community".

References

1916 births
1984 deaths
Canadian university and college faculty deans
Companions of the Order of Canada
Fellows of the Royal Society of Canada
People from Saint-Hyacinthe
Academics from Quebec
Academic staff of the University of Ottawa